Bidesk-e Monond (also Romanized as Bīdesk-e Monond; also known as Bīdesk, Bedesk, Bedestk, and Bīdesg) is a village in Qohestan Rural District, Qohestan District, Darmian County, South Khorasan Province, Iran. At the 2006 census, its population was 86, in 37 families.

References 

Populated places in Darmian County